Barron River is an electoral district of the Legislative Assembly in the Australian state of Queensland.

Created at the 1971 redistribution, it currently covers the northern suburbs of Cairns, as well as Kuranda.  The Barron River from which the electorate derives its name runs through its centre. It is bordered by the districts of Cook to the north and west, Cairns to the southeast and Mulgrave to the south.

Members for Barron River

Election results

References

External links
 Electorate Profile (Antony Green, ABC)

Cairns, Queensland
Barron River
Far North Queensland